is a private junior college in Koshigaya, Saitama, Japan, established in April 2011. The predecessor of the school was founded in April 1973.

References

External links
  

Japanese junior colleges
Universities and colleges in Saitama Prefecture
Koshigaya, Saitama